Katnaghbyur (also Romanized as Kat’naghbyur, Katnakhpyur, Katnagbyur, and Katnaghpyur; formerly, Koturbulag) is a village in the Lori Province of Armenia.

References

Populated places in Lori Province